Senna caudata is a flowering plant species in the legume family (Fabaceae). This plant is found only in Costa Rica and Panama.

References

 

caudata
Flora of Costa Rica
Flora of Panama
Vulnerable plants
Taxonomy articles created by Polbot